The Trans-Proteomic Pipeline (TPP) is an open-source  data analysis software for proteomics developed at the Institute for Systems Biology (ISB) by the Ruedi Aebersold group under the Seattle Proteome Center.  The TPP includes PeptideProphet, ProteinProphet, ASAPRatio, XPRESS and Libra.

Software Components

Probability Assignment and Validation  
PeptideProphet performs statistical validation of peptide-spectra-matches (PSM) using the results of search engines by estimating a false discovery rate (FDR) on PSM level. The initial PeptideProphet used a fit of a Gaussian distribution for the correct identifications and a fit of a gamma distribution for the incorrect identification. A later modification of the program allowed the usage of a target-decoy approach, using either a variable component mixture model or a semi-parametric mixture model. In the PeptideProphet, specifying a decoy tag will use the variable component mixture model while selecting a non-parametric model will use the semi-parametric mixture model.

ProteinProphet identifies proteins based on the results of PeptideProphet.

Mayu performs statistical validation of protein identification by estimating a False Discovery Rate (FDR) on protein level.

Spectral library handling  
The SpectraST tool is able to generate spectral libraries and search datasets using these libraries.

See also 
 OpenMS
 ProteoWizard
 Mass spectrometry software

References 

Free science software
Bioinformatics software
Mass spectrometry software
Proteomics